Cowley Airport  is located  northwest of Cowley, Alberta, Canada.

References

External links
Page about this airport on COPA's Places to Fly airport directory
Alberta Soaring Council

Registered aerodromes in Alberta
Municipal District of Pincher Creek No. 9